Tasersuatsiaq (old spelling: Taserssuatsiaq) is a lake in central-western Greenland, in the Qeqqata municipality. During the operating years of the American base at Bluie West Eight at Kangerlussuaq the lake was referred to as Lake Ferguson. The lake and the Roklubben Restaurant at its western shore are connected to Kangerlussuaq by a gravel road, one of the very few in Greenland. Tasersuatsiaq is a source of fresh water for Kangerlussuaq.

Geography 

The 2x6km lake is separated from the valleys of Qinnguata Kuussua and Akuliarusiarsuup Kuua, as well as the Kangerlussuaq settlement in the north by a low tundra ridge of Qaarsorsuaq. To the west lies the far end of the Kangerlussuaq Fjord. On the southern and eastern side it is bounded by a vast highland of Ammalortup Nunaa, the original region artificially populated with 27 muskoxen.

Flora and fauna 
The bottom of the lake is covered with pondweed meadows. Muskoxen and reindeer are common in the area.

References 

Kangerlussuaq
Lakes of Greenland